The 1949 UMass Redmen football team represented the University of Massachusetts Amherst in the 1949 college football season as a member of the Yankee Conference. The team was coached by Thomas Eck and played its home games at Alumni Field in Amherst, Massachusetts. UMass finished the season with a record of 3–5 overall and 1–1 in conference play.

Schedule

References

UMass
UMass Minutemen football seasons
UMass Redmen football